Thomas Charles Fulp (born April 30, 1978) is an American programmer known for creating the website Newgrounds and co-founding the video game company The Behemoth.

Fulp has been credited with "changing the landscape of the Internet forever" by kickstarting the browser game scene in the late 1990s, both with the releases of his own advanced Flash games and the launch of the Newgrounds Portal, which made Newgrounds one of the first sites that allowed creators to easily share their creations with a large online audience. Fulp is also notable for his browser game preservation work.

Biography
Fulp was born and raised in Perkasie, Pennsylvania, on April 30, 1978. In 1991, Fulp launched a Neo Geo fanzine called New Ground and sent issues to approximately 100 members of a club originating on the online service Prodigy.
Using a hosting service, he launched a website called New Ground Remix in 1995, which increased in popularity during the summer of 1996 after Fulp created the BBS games Club a Seal and Assassin, after graduating from Pennridge High School. Eventually, this site turned into Newgrounds.com.

In 1999, Fulp created the game Pico's School in Shockwave Flash 3, before the launch of the scripting language ActionScript that subsequent Flash game developers would use. The game "exhibited a complexity of design and polish in presentation that was virtually unseen in amateur Flash game development" until then and has been credited both with helping kickstarting the Flash games scene and launching Newgrounds as a "public force".

Fulp co-created the Flash game Alien Hominid, which he later developed for consoles under The Behemoth, and the console game Castle Crashers.

Fulp received the Pioneer award at the 2021 Game Developers Choice Awards for the creation of Newgrounds and for being a trailblazer of the Macromedia Flash games that helped define a generation of indie developers.

Games
 Nene Interactive Suicide (1999)
 Pico's School (1999)
 Alien Hominid (2002)
 Castle Crashers (2008)
 The Room Tribute (2010)
 BattleBlock Theater (2013)
 Pit People (2018)

References

External links
 

1978 births
Living people
American video game designers
American technology chief executives
American computer businesspeople
People from Bucks County, Pennsylvania
Browser game developers
Newgrounds people
Drexel University alumni
Game Developers Conference Pioneer Award recipients